Jean Ruffier des Aimés (15 April 1902 – 13 April 1976) was a French rower. He competed in the men's coxed four event at the 1928 Summer Olympics.

References

1902 births
1976 deaths
French male rowers
Olympic rowers of France
Rowers at the 1928 Summer Olympics
Rowers from Paris